Lawrence Bain Hagel (born March 27, 1947) was appointed to the United States Court of Appeals for Veterans Claims by President George W. Bush in December 2003.  He became Chief Judge in August 2015.  His 13-year term expired in December 2016.

Early life and military career
Judge Hagel was born in Washington, Indiana.  He graduated from the United States Naval Academy with a Bachelor of Science in 1969.  Upon graduation, Judge Hagel was commissioned as a Second Lieutenant in the United States Marine Corps.  Judge Hagel served as an Infantry Platoon Commander in the Vietnam War.  He also served as a Military Advisor to a Vietnamese Infantry Battalion.  Judge Hagel was awarded the Combat Action Ribbon, the Meritorious Service Medal (three awards), the Joint Service Commendation Medal, and the Army Commendation Medal.

Legal education and career
In 1976, Judge Hagel graduated from the University of the Pacific McGeorge School of Law with a Juris Doctor degree.  In 1983, he earned a Master of Laws degree in labor law, graduating with highest honors from The National Law Center at George Washington University Law School.

Prior to his appointment to the U.S. Court of Appeals for Veterans Claims, Judge Hagel was General Counsel to the Paralyzed Veterans of America.  During his time with the Paralyzed Veterans of America, Judge Hagel was instrumental in advocating on behalf of military veterans with spinal cord injuries and diseases.

During the 14 years prior to his appointment to the U.S. Court of Appeals for Veterans Claims, Judge Hagel was committed to promoting legal issues concerning veterans and veterans' benefits.  In 1995, he served as a member of the Administrative Conference of the United States.  He served on the Steering Committee for the District of Columbia Bar Administrative Law and Agency Practice Section from 1999–2003 and on the United States Court of Appeals for Veterans Claims Rules Advisory Committee from 1992-2003.  He served on the Executive Board of the Veterans Consortium Pro Bono Program from 1992-2003.  Judge Hagel served as Chair of the Veterans Law Committee Section of the Federal Bar Association from 1994  to 1995.

Personal life
Hagel is the father of comedy writer Jenny Hagel.

References

External links
 https://archive.today/20120805232921/http://www.uscourts.cavc.gov/about//judges/JudgeHagel.cfm
 http://www.uscourts.cavc.gov/
 https://web.archive.org/web/20100316233112/http://www.cavcbar.net/index.html
 http://www.pva.org/
 http://www.vetsprobono.org/
Presidential Nomination: Lawrence Bain Hagel

1947 births
Living people
Judges of the United States Court of Appeals for Veterans Claims
United States Article I federal judges appointed by George W. Bush
21st-century American judges